Bartne  ', (Bortne, Bortne) is a village in the administrative district of Gmina Sękowa, within Gorlice County, Lesser Poland Voivodeship, in southern Poland, close to the border with Slovakia.

The village has a population of 190.

History
The father of 18th century Classical composer Dmytro Bortniansky was born in Bartne and emigrated to the Russian Empire for religious reasons.

References

Bartne